Bertha Sophia Menzler-Peyton (1871-1947) was an American painter active in Chicago, where she was born.

Early life
Menzler-Peyton was born on June 25, 1871 in Chicago. She studied art at the Chicago Art Institute. From there she moved to Paris where she continued her studies with Luc-Olivier Merson, Raphaël Collin, and Edmond Aman-Jean. She was married to Alfred Peyton.

Returning to live in Chicago, Menzler-Peyton painted one in a series of eight murals, begun in 1900, that were located on the tenth floor of the Fine Arts Building, lacerated at 410 South Michigan Avenue, Chicago.

At the 1919 annual meeting of the National Association of Women Painters and Sculptors "held in the board room of the Architectural League of New York in November," Menzler Peyton and Miss Florence Francis Snell were elected vice-presidents;

Menzler-Peyton died on March 21, 1947 in Boston, Massachusetts. Her work was included in the 2016 - 2017 exhibition Rebels With a Cause: American Impressionist Women organized by the Huntsville Museum of Art.

Work
works referenced at the Smithsonian American Art Museum database unless otherwise noted.

 The Muscovite Family, Brooklyn Museum, Brooklyn, New York
 San Francisco Peaks, Atchison, Topeka and Santa Fe Railway, Chicago, Illinois
 Desert Effects, Arizona, Atchison, Topeka and Santa Fe Railway
 Sunshine and Shower, Grand Canyon, Atchison, Topeka and Santa Fe Railway
 Sunshine and Shower, Grand Canyon, Atchison, Topeka and Santa Fe Railway
 Western Landscape, Santa Fe Collection of Southwestern Art, Santa Fe, New Mexico
 various private collections

Gallery

References

External links 
 

1871 births
1947 deaths
19th-century American painters
20th-century American painters
American women painters
19th-century American women artists
20th-century American women artists
School of the Art Institute of Chicago alumni